Tarter's Ferry Bridge was one of nine metal highway bridges in Fulton County, Illinois listed on the National Register of Historic Places. This particular one was a 9-panel Parker through truss that carried Tarter Ferry Road over the Spoon River near Smithfield, Illinois. It was added to the National Register of Historic Places on October 29, 1980, along with the eight other bridges, as one of the "Metal Highway Bridges of Fulton County. The bridge was one of three in Smithfield listed on the Register, the others are the  Bernadotte Bridge and the destroyed Buckeye Bridge, as well as the demolished Elrod Bridge. Others, such as the Duncan Mills Bridge in Lewistown, are located throughout the county.

The bridge was washed off its substructure during a flood in the spring of 2013. It had been abandoned for many years.

Notes

External links
Tarter's Ferry Bridge on bridgehunter.com

Road bridges on the National Register of Historic Places in Illinois
Bridges in Fulton County, Illinois
Bridges completed in 1880
National Register of Historic Places in Fulton County, Illinois
1880 establishments in Illinois
Metal bridges in the United States
Parker truss bridges in the United States
Buildings and structures destroyed by flooding